The 12th Australian Academy of Cinema and Television Arts International Awards, commonly known as the AACTA International Awards, is presented by the Australian Academy of Cinema and Television Arts (AACTA), a non-profit organisation whose aim is to identify, award, promote and celebrate Australia's greatest achievements in film and television. Awards were handed out for the best films of 2022, regardless of the country of origin, and are the international counterpart to the awards for Australian films. Winners were announced virtually on 24 February 2023.

Nominations were announced on 15 December 2022, with Everything Everywhere All at Once and The Banshees of Inisherin leading with six each.

Winners and nominees

Film

Television

References

External links
 The Official Australian Academy of Cinema and Television Arts website

AACTA Awards
AACTA Awards ceremonies
2022 in American cinema
AACTA International Awards
AACTA International Awards